Mercedes Paz and Rene Simpson were the defending champions but did not compete that year.

Laura Montalvo and Paola Suárez won in the final 6–7, 6–3, 6–4 against Alexia Dechaume-Balleret and Alexandra Fusai.

Seeds
Champion seeds are indicated in bold text while text in italics indicates the round in which those seeds were eliminated.

 Alexia Dechaume-Balleret /  Alexandra Fusai (final)
 Sandra Cecchini /  Laura Garrone (quarterfinals)
 Petra Langrová /  Radka Zrubáková (first round)
 Flora Perfetti /  Gloria Pizzichini (semifinals)

Draw

External links
 1996 "M" Electronika Cup Doubles Draw

Croatian Bol Ladies Open
1996 WTA Tour